Aleksandr Eduardovich Koksharov (born 20 December 2004) is a Russian footballer who plays as a forward for FC Krasnodar.

Career
Koksharov made his debut for FC Krasnodar on 28 September 2022 in a Russian Cup game against Pari Nizhny Novgorod. He made his Russian Premier League debut for Krasnodar on 3 October 2022 against Krylia Sovetov Samara.

Personal life
His father Eduard Koksharov is an Olympic champion in handball.

Career statistics

References

External links
 
 
 

Living people
2004 births
Russian footballers
Association football forwards
Russian Premier League players
FC Krasnodar players